The Fusselman Formation is a geologic formation in westernmost Texas and southern New Mexico. It preserves fossils dating back to the early Silurian period.

Description

The formation consists mostly of medium to dark gray massive dolomite. It has a light and dark banded appearance due to alternating beds of light gray peritidal laminated carbonate mudstone and dark gray cherty wackestone or packstone containing abundant corals. The formations unconformably overlies the Montoya Group and is overlain by the Onate Formation. The upper contact shows that the area was tilted and eroded prior to the Devonian.

The formation is divided into the Chamberino, Flag Hill, and Crazycat members in the Sacramento Mountains.

Extensive dolomitization of the formation has obscured its primary depositional fabric and made interpretation of its depositional environment difficult.

Fossils
The formation is relatively poor in fossils compared with the underlying El Paso Formation. However, it contains fossils of pentamerid brachiopods, corals, and stromatoporoids. These include the corals Cyanthophyllum, Favosites, Halysites, and Heliolites and the gastropod Hormatoma.

Economic geology
The uppermost part of the formation shows significant barite-fluorite and base metal mineralization, where migrating fluids are trapped by the overlying impermeable shale formations.

History of investigation
The name was first used by G.B. Richardson in 1908 for outcrops in Fusselman Canyon in the Franklin Mountains. It was divided into members in the Florida Mountains by Kottlowski and Pray in 1967.

See also

 List of fossiliferous stratigraphic units in Texas
 Paleontology in Texas

Footnotes

References
 
 
 
 

Silurian formations of New Mexico
Geologic formations of Texas
Silurian System of North America